In differential geometry, a metaplectic structure is the symplectic analog of spin structure on orientable Riemannian manifolds. A metaplectic structure on a symplectic manifold allows one to define the symplectic spinor bundle, which is the Hilbert space bundle associated to the metaplectic structure via the metaplectic representation, giving rise to the notion of a symplectic spinor field in differential geometry.

Symplectic spin structures have wide applications to mathematical physics, in particular to quantum field theory where they are an essential ingredient in establishing the idea that symplectic spin geometry and symplectic Dirac operators may give valuable tools in symplectic geometry and symplectic topology. They are also of purely mathematical interest in differential geometry, algebraic topology, and K theory.  They form the foundation for symplectic spin geometry.

Formal definition 
A metaplectic structure  on a symplectic manifold  is an equivariant lift of the symplectic frame bundle  with respect to the double covering  In other words, a pair  is a metaplectic structure on the principal bundle  when
b)  is an equivariant -fold covering map such that

Obstruction 
Since every symplectic manifold  is necessarily of even dimension and orientable, one can prove that the topological obstruction to the existence of metaplectic structures is precisely the same as in Riemannian spin geometry. In other words, a symplectic manifold  admits a metaplectic structures if and only if the second Stiefel-Whitney class  of  vanishes. In fact, the modulo  reduction of the first Chern class  is the second Stiefel-Whitney class . Hence,  admits metaplectic structures if and only if  is even, i.e., if and only if  is zero.

As the manifold  is assumed to be oriented, the first Stiefel-Whitney class  of  vanishes too.

Examples

Manifolds admitting a metaplectic structure 
Phase spaces   any orientable manifold.
Complex projective spaces   Since  is simply connected, such a structure has to be unique.
Grassmannian  etc.

See also 
 Metaplectic group
 Symplectic frame bundle
 Symplectic group
 Symplectic spinor bundle

Notes

References 
 

Symplectic geometry
Structures on manifolds
Algebraic topology